Linas Antanas Linkevičius (born 6 January 1961) is a Lithuanian diplomat and a former Minister of Foreign Affairs and Minister of National Defence.

Early life 
He was born into an engineer and teacher family. His childhood and school years were spent in Kaunas. In 1978, he graduated from the Kaunas 7th Secondary School with a gold medal. From 1978-1983, he studied at the Faculty of Automation of Kaunas Polytechnic Institute, graduating with an electrical engineering degree. During the rest of the 80s, he served as secretary of the local Lithuanian Komsomol district in Panemunė.

Political career 
Linkevičius served as minister of National Defence from 1993 to 1996 and from 2000 to 2004. He was the Lithuanian Permanent Representative to NATO from 2005 until 2011.

Minister of Foreign Affairs, 2012–2020 

In December 2012 Linkevičius was appointed Minister of Foreign Affairs.

Throughout his term as foreign minister, Linkevičius has corroborated Lithuania's status within many international and multilateral entities and organizations, including the United Nations, NATO and the European Union. He managed to establish strong personal ties with prominent international leaders like Laurent Fabius, Angela Merkel and Shimon Peres, whom he invited to be an advisor to the project of the Jewish Memorial Center in Vilnius, on the site of the Great Synagogue of Vilna.

He is known to be a partisan of international collaboration in fields like science, sport and the arts, in order to strengthen the image of Lithuania and to enhance its global standpoint.

In 2015, Linkevičius visited Saudi Arabia and met with the King Salman of Saudi Arabia. He said back then "I think that after this visit our relations will become much more systematic."

Linkevičius expressed deep concern over the escalation of hostilities in the disputed region of Nagorno-Karabakh and called on Armenia and Azerbaijan to immediately halt fighting and progress towards a peaceful resolution.

On 9 March 2018, after Poland's referral to the European Court of Justice, leaders of Latvia, Lithuania and Estonia expressed their support for Poland over the Article 7 of the Treaty on European Union. On 13 September 2018, Linkevičius has re-confirmed Lithuania's stand: "We will oppose the sanctions against Poland. This dialogue is very complicated but we believe that the result will be positive."

Other activities
 Center for European Policy Analysis (CEPA), Member of the International Leadership Council (since 2022)
 European Council on Foreign Relations (ECFR), Member

Political positions

Linkevičius has been a constant opponent within the European Union and NATO of compromises with Russia over Ukraine. When measures to re-engage Russia were discussed in Brussels, in January 2015, he strongly objected. "I do not think we should think how to re-engage; Russia should think how to re-engage . . . I see no reason why we should invent something," he was quoted.

"We can't trust a single word of the Russian leadership. [Russia's] statements are worthless," he was quoted as saying in a public speech in March 2015, scolding some of his European Union colleagues for being detached from "reality" in seeking to soften or unroll some of the sanctions against Russia. 

In a newspaper column, in June 2015, Linkevičius warned Lithuania's NATO partners against regression to a mid-Cold War-like détente with Russia, as the one experienced in the late 1960s and throughout the 1970s. Russia, he wrote, no longer poses "a serious alternative to Western liberal democracy", and its adversarial relations with the rest of Europe are "just a Kremlin construct, invented by modern Russia to cover failures of reform."

Referring to Lithuania as a "frontline state" with Russia, he urged in that column that "NATO’s capabilities should be based on sober threat analyses, not illusions. Anything that the Kremlin perceives as weakness will encourage it to press ahead."

Awards 
In March 2021, the Center for Belarusian Solidarity awarded Linkevičius the Global Belarusian Solidarity Award in the category "Melted Ice".

See also
List of foreign ministers in 2017
List of current foreign ministers

References

External links

 Short biography

|-

|-

1961 births
Living people
Members of the Seimas
Ministers of Defence of Lithuania
Ministers of Foreign Affairs of Lithuania
Journalists from Vilnius
Recipients of the Order of the Cross of Terra Mariana, 2nd Class
Democratic Labour Party of Lithuania politicians
Social Democratic Party of Lithuania politicians
21st-century Lithuanian politicians
Permanent Representatives of Lithuania to NATO